Faith Christian School is a private Christian school located in Rocky Mount, North Carolina.

References

External links

Christian schools in North Carolina
Private high schools in North Carolina
Schools in Nash County, North Carolina
Private middle schools in North Carolina
Private elementary schools in North Carolina